Bhoja II (910–913), according to the Asiatic Society's Plate of Vinakapala, acceded to the throne of the Pratihara dynasty after his father Mahendrapala I. His mother was queen Dehanaga-Devi. He reigned for a short time and was overthrown by his step-brother Mahipala I.

References

10th-century Indian monarchs
Pratihara empire